Lee Sang-bok (born 17 March 1968) is a retired badminton player from South Korea.

Career
Lee competed in badminton at the 1992 Summer Olympics in the men's doubles with Shon Jin-hwan. They lost in quarterfinals to Rudy Gunawan and Eddy Hartono, of Indonesia, 4–15, 15–18. He was the silver medalist in the men's doubles discipline partnering Lee Gwang-jin at the 1988 Seoul Olympics when badminton was played as an exhibition sport. He also won a silver medal in 1988 Asian invitational meet with Park Joo-bong.

Achievements

IBF World Grand Prix 
The World Badminton Grand Prix sanctioned by International Badminton Federation (IBF) from 1983 to 2006.

Men's doubles

Invitational tournament 
Men's doubles

References

External links
European results

1968 births
Living people
South Korean male badminton players
Badminton players at the 1988 Summer Olympics
Badminton players at the 1992 Summer Olympics
Olympic badminton players of South Korea